South Korea is a major energy importer, importing nearly all of its oil needs and ranking as the second-largest importer of liquefied natural gas in the world.
Electricity generation in the country mainly comes from conventional thermal power, which accounts for more than two thirds of production, and from nuclear power.

Energy producers were dominated by government enterprises, although privately operated coal mines and oil refineries also existed. The National Assembly enacted a broad electricity sector restructuring program in 2000, but the restructuring process was halted amid political controversy in 2004 and remains a topic of intense political debate.

South Korea has no proven oil reserves. Exploration until the 1980s in the Yellow Sea and on the continental shelf between Korea and Japan did not find any offshore oil. Coal supply in the country is insufficient and of low quality. The potential for hydroelectric power is limited because of high seasonal variations in the weather and the concentration of most of the rainfall in the summer. As of 2017, South Korean President Moon Jae-in has vowed to end the country’s reliance on coal and also said the nation would move away from nuclear energy. He has taken a major step in that direction in June, saying his country would not try to extend the life of its nuclear plants, would close existing coal-fired plants, and would not build any new coal plants.

In recent years, South Korea has set a new direction for its energy sector, with significant decarbonization goals, aiming to raise the share of electricity from renewable sources from 6% in 2019 to 35% by 2030.

Overview
Final energy consumption by source (2010):
 Coal: 27.6 Mtoe (million tonne of oil equivalent) (14.2%)
 Petroleum: 100.5 Mtoe (51.6%)
 LNG: 21.9 Mtoe (11.3%)
 Electricity: 37.3 Mtoe (19.2%)
 Heat: 1.7 Mtoe (0.9%)
 Renewable: 5.8 Mtoe (3%)

Electric power

History
The Korea Electric Power Corporation (KEPCO) provided electricity in the country. When KEPCO's predecessor, KECO, was founded in 1961, annual power production was 1,770 GWh. Production reached 73,992 GWh in 1987. In that year, residential customers used 17.9% of total production, public and service businesses used 16.2%, and the industrial sector used 65.9%. Sources of power generation were primarily nuclear power, coal, oil, and liquefied natural gas. Of the 54,885 GWh of electricity generated in 1985, 22% came from nuclear plants then in operation, 74% from non-nuclear thermal plants (oil and coal), and 4% from hydroelectric sites. It was predicted in 1988 that the generation structure by the year 2000 would be 10.2% hydroelectric, 12.2% oil, 22.9% coal, 10.2% LNG, and 44.5% nuclear.

Statistics

Sources

Thermal
 KEPCO (한국전력공사) controls 5 regional gencos who sell via KPX to the grid:
 Korea East-West Power (한국동서발전㈜)
 Korea Midland Power (한국중부발전㈜)
 Korea South-Eastern Power (한국남동발전㈜)
 Korea Southern Power (한국남부발전㈜)
 Korea Western Power (한국서부발전㈜)
KOGAS (한국가스공사) acts as importer of LNG for the power generators.

Cogeneration and steam-heating 
 Korea District Heating Corporation (KDHC, 한국지역난방공사㈜) supplies steam and CHP to the Seoul area and Daegu. GS Power and SH Corp are local providers. KDHC is the world's largest district heating company.

Nuclear Power 

South Korea placed a heavy emphasis on nuclear power generation. The country's first nuclear power plant, the Kori Number One located near Pusan, which opened in 1977. Eight plants operated in 1987 when atomic power generation was an estimated 71,158 million kilowatts, or 53.1% of total electric power.

Renewable energy 

After years of incremental policy changes and investments, the country has set ambitious targets and announced major projects. In 2021, President Moon Jae-in announced a planned 8.2GW offshore wind farm that will be the largest in the world. 

The country's national Renewable Portfolio Standard (RPS) previously required a gradual increase of the renewable share of electricity generation from 2% in 2012 to 10% in 2023. The 9th Basic Plan for Long-term Electricity Supply and Demand 2020–2034, released in 2021, now targets 35% by 2030.

South Korea is fast-growing gigawatt-market for photovoltaics (PV) and plans to install 31 GW of solar power by 2030.

Hydro also comes under Korea Hydro & Nuclear Power Ltd. (한국수력원자력㈜)

Storage 
In December 2017, Hyundai Electric announced a plan to build a 150MW grid storage battery near Ulsan for Korea Zinc.

Global warming 

According to the Carbon Dioxide Information Analysis Center CDIAC South Korea is among the top ten, namely ninth, highest country in carbon dioxide emissions in the period 1950-2005. The United States (25%), China (10%) and Russia (8%) are the countries with the highest carbon dioxide emissions from 1950 to 2005.

See also 

 Economy of South Korea
 Environment of South Korea
 Green Party Korea
 One Less Nuclear Power Plant
 Wind power in South Korea
 Solar power in South Korea
 Renewable energy by country

References